Gérard Laprise (19 April 1925 – 14 November 2000) was a Social Credit Party and Ralliement créditiste member of the House of Commons of Canada. He was born in La Sarre, Quebec and became a carpenter by career.

He was first elected at the Chapleau riding in the 1962 general election with the Social Credit party, but was under the Ralliement créditiste banner from 1963 to 1971.

Timeline

Election campaigns
 1962 federal election: Elected at Chapleau
 1963 federal election: Elected at Chapleau
 1965 federal election: Elected at Chapleau
 1968 federal election: Elected at Abitibi
 1972 federal election: Elected at Abitibi
 1974 federal election: Elected at Abitibi

Caucus service
 27 September 1962 – 31 August 1963: Social Credit Party, to end of 25th Parliament
 1 September 1963 – 31 March 1971: Ralliement Créditiste, before end of 28th Parliament
 1 April 1971 – 26 March 1979: Social Credit Party, to end of 30th Parliament

External links
 

 Gérard Laprise fonds, Library and Archives Canada

1925 births
2000 deaths
Members of the House of Commons of Canada from Quebec
Social Credit Party of Canada MPs